Lysimachia quadrifolia, the whorled loosestrife, whorled yellow loosestrife, or crosswort, is a species of herbaceous plant in the family Primulaceae. It native to the eastern United States and Canada.

Description
The long roots are shallow, sometimes spreading along the surface of the ground. It usually has simple, unbranched stems. The leaves are spotted and hairy on the undersides. They are borne in whorls of 3 to 7 around the stem. The flowers grow on long stalks from the leaf whorls. The five-parted flower is yellow with a reddish center and sometimes reddish margins, and streaked with dark resin canals. It is a perennial herb that grows in fens and moist prairies.

Gallery

References

External links

quadrifolia
Flora of Eastern Canada
Flora of the Eastern United States
Flora of the Great Lakes region (North America)
Plants described in 1753
Taxa named by Carl Linnaeus